The Orebodies 18, 23 and 25 mine, part of BHP's Eastern Ridge hub and officially referred to as the Newman East operation, is an iron ore mine located in the Pilbara region of Western Australia, 8 kilometres east of Newman.
The mine is majority-owned (85 percent) and operated by BHP, and is one of seven iron ore mines the company operates in the Pilbara. The company also operates two port facilities at Port Hedland, Nelson Point and Finucane Island, and over 1,000 kilometres of rail in the Pilbara.

BHP is the second-largest iron ore mining company in the Pilbara, behind Rio Tinto and ahead of Fortescue Metals Group. As of 2010, BHP employs 8,000 people in its Pilbara operations.

On 25 February 2014 Macmahon Holdings announced that the operations at Orebody 18 would be run by BHP Billiton, completing the transition to owner-operator for all BHP iron ore mine sites in Western Australia.

Overview

The first iron ore mine to be developed in the Pilbara was the Goldsworthy mine in 1965. It was supported by a railway line, the Goldsworthy railway, as well as port facilities at Finucane Island. On 1 June 1966, the first shipment of iron ore left the Pilbara on board the Harvey S. Mudd.

At Orebody 25, BHP operates a processing plant consisting of a primary and secondary crusher, and a screening plant. BHP does not report the annual production of the mine separately, but rather together with its other Newman operations which, in 2009-10, produced a combined 37 million tonnes of ore.

References

Iron ore mines in Western Australia
Surface mines in Australia
BHP
Hamersley Range
Itochu
Shire of East Pilbara